A constitutional referendum was held in Turkey on 6 September 1987 to amend the "temporary article" 4 of the constitution, which had forbidden the leaders of banned parties (a total of 242 people) from taking part in politics for 10 years. The governing party ANAP agreed to the referendum after a compromise with the opposition parties regarding constitutional changes. ANAP campaigned for No, while most opposition parties campaigned for Yes vote. The changes were narrowly approved by 50.2% of voters, with a 93.36% turnout.

Campaign positions 
In the referendum, "yes" voters used the color blue, while "no" voters used the orange color as a symbol. Political parties close to banned leaders participated in the 'Blue Color Yes' (Turkish: Mavi Renkli Evet) campaign carried out by four banned leaders to lift the bans in the said referendum. True Path Party, Democratic Left Party, Nationalist Task Party, Welfare Party supported a "yes" vote. In addition, Social Democratic Populist Party, although not under the control of any banned leader, called for a 'Yes' vote for September 6, especially their leader Erdal İnönü organized country-wide rallies for this purpose.

Political parties

Results

References

External links
Results

1987
1987 referendums
1987 in Turkey